Otvazhnoye is a rural locality (a selo) and the administrative center of Otvazhnensky Selsoviet of Arkharinsky District, Amur Oblast, Russia. The population was 667 as of 2018. There are 14 streets.

Geography 
Otvazhnoye is located on the left bank of the Arkhara River, 12 km south of Arkhara (the district's administrative centre) by road. Tatakan is the nearest rural locality.

References 

Rural localities in Arkharinsky District